San Ciro de Acosta is a town and municipality in San Luis Potosí in central Mexico.

References 

Municipalities of San Luis Potosí